Rosemary Lodge is a historic home located at Water Mill in Suffolk County, New York. It is a -story frame Shingle Style constructed in 1884 as an unfinished shell from plans prepared by architect Frederick W. Stickney.  The rear wing was added in 1904.  The house features a steep gable roof, broad porch, several upper story projections, and asymmetrical massing.  The house was moved to its present site in 1985.

It was added to the National Register of Historic Places in 2000.

References

Houses on the National Register of Historic Places in New York (state)
Houses completed in 1884
Shingle Style houses
Houses in Suffolk County, New York
National Register of Historic Places in Suffolk County, New York
Shingle Style architecture in New York (state)